Okolnoye is a rural locality (a selo) in Starooskolsky District, Belgorod Oblast, Russia. The population was 144 as of 2010. There are 2 streets.

Geography 
Okolnoye is located 24 km southwest of Stary Oskol (the district's administrative centre) by road. Dolgaya Polyana is the nearest rural locality.

References 

Rural localities in Starooskolsky District